Marianas High School (MHS) is a public high school located in Susupe on Saipan in the United States Commonwealth of the Northern Mariana Islands (CNMI). It is one of six high schools operated by the CNMI Public School System, and the largest of three public high schools serving the island of Saipan.

History
Opened in fall 1969, the school is the oldest of the five high schools on Saipan. It replaced the high school program at Hopwood Junior High School, which closed in 1968 when Typhoon Jean occurred.

In June 2011, as a result of years of effort, Marianas High School proudly announced it achieved above average scores on 5 of the 8 Stanford Achievement Test Series (SAT 10). The overall average score puts MHS in the 51st percentile.  This was the first time a CNMI high school has outperformed the national average.   In 2013, five MHS students were named AP Scholars and two were named Scholars with Honors by the CollegeBoard.  In addition, three MHS students were named Gates Scholars in recognition of their outstanding academic performance.  Finally, in 2013, the MHS STEM team won a National Championship for its unmanned search and rescue plane, the first national championship ever won by a US territory. Then again in late 2015, the MHS STEM team won another National Championship led by fellow instructor Mr. John D. Raulerson.

Controversies 
 In 2008, a security guard was brutally murdered on campus by teens stealing laptops.

Notable alumni
Miguel S. Demapan, former Chief Justice of the Northern Mariana Islands Supreme Court
Gregorio Sablan, Delegate to the United States House of Representatives (2009–present)
Michelle Ngirbabul, 2014 Rangel Scholar
Luis John Castro, Member of the Northern Mariana Islands House of Representatives (2019–present)

References

External links
 Marianas High School Official Website
 Marianas High School profile at CNMI Public School System
 

Public high schools in the United States
High schools in the Northern Mariana Islands
Educational institutions established in 1969
1969 establishments in the Northern Mariana Islands